The 2000 SWAC men's basketball tournament was held March 9–11, 2000, at the Mississippi Coast Coliseum in Biloxi, Mississippi. Jackson State defeated , 76–61 in the championship game. The Tigers received the conference's automatic bid to the 2000 NCAA tournament as No. 16 seed in the West Region.

Bracket and results

References

1999–2000 Southwestern Athletic Conference men's basketball season
SWAC men's basketball tournament